Cytogenetic and Genome Research is the name of a peer-reviewed scientific journal that was established in 1962. It was published previously under the names Cytogenetics (1962–1972) and Cytogenetics and Cell Genetics (1973–2001).

Abstracting and indexing 
The journal is abstracted and indexed in Current Contents/Life Sciences, PubMed/MEDLINE, EMBASE/Excerpta Medica, CAB Abstracts, Scopus, Biological Abstracts, BIOSIS Previews, Journal Citation Reports (Science Edition), Science Citation Index, Science Citation Index Expanded, Web of Science and Zoological Record
. According to the Journal Citation Reports, the journal has a 2014 impact factor of 1.561.

References

External links 
 

Molecular and cellular biology journals
Genetics journals
Publications established in 1962
Karger academic journals